Batterie Pommern, also known as Lange Max, was the world's biggest gun in 1917, during World War I.
The German gun was of type 38 cm SK L/45 "Max" and had a modified design by Krupp compared to earlier German 38 cm gun types. The modification allowed the gun to shoot from Koekelare to Dunkirk, which is about 50 km away.

Location
Batterie Pommern is located in Koekelare (Belgium) in the neighborhood called Leugenboom. It is part of Site Lange Max, next to the Lange Max Museum.
Today, the immense artillery platform can still be visited.

Construction
The 15inch (38 cm) long range gun, protected by armour, was mounted on a steel bridge having a pivot in front. The rear part of the gun travelled along a circular rail-track in a concrete pit of about 70 feet in diameter. The gun was manoeuvred by means of electric motors. On either side were large shelters in reinforced concrete. In front of and below the platform there was an electric generator group. A large shelter of reinforced concrete on the right was probably the Post of Commandment. There was a dummy gun emplacement further on.

History
On 27 June 1917 the gun fired for the first time. Its target was Dunkirk where the first shot was a direct hit. Dunkirk and Ypres were the main targets of the gun. During the Battle of Passchendaele it played a significant role for the Germans.

During the Interbellum the Pommern battery was one of the most successful attractions in the battlefield tourism in Belgium. It was featured in the Michelin Guide "L'Yser et la côte belge".
Famous visitors to the Site Lange Max over time include:
 Winston Churchill, around the Interwar period.
 Hirohito, 124th Emperor of Japan
 Margaret Hall
 King George V, King of the United Kingdom (10 December 1918). 
 Prince Edward, Prince of Wales, future King of the United Kingdom and Emperor of India (10 December 1918).
 Prince George, future King of the United Kingdom and Emperor of India (10 December 1918).
 Raymond Poincaré, French President (9 November 1918).
 Prince Leopold, future King of the Belgians (9 November 1918).
 Geert Bourgeois, Minister-President of Flanders (October 2014).
 Eckart Cuntz, Ambassador of the Federal Republic of Germany  (8 November 2014).
 Royal Thai Embassy to Belgium, (17 January 2015).
 Bart Tommelein, Vice Minister-President and Flemish Minister for Finance, Budget and Energy in the Bourgeois Government (March 2016).
 Sven Gatz, Flemish Minister for Culture, Youth, Media and Brussels in the Bourgeois Government (June 2016).

Image gallery

References

Raf Seys, Commeine L.: Lange Max : het groot kanon van Leugenboom, Devriendt, Koekelare, 192 p.

External links
 

World War I sites in Belgium
Koekelare